Arna Station is the second largest train station in Bergen, Norway; located in the Arna borough on the east side of Ulriken and between the two tunnels Ulriken Tunnel and Arnanipa. The present station was opened in 1964, when the tunnels were completed. The old station, located north of the new station, is still in use for heritage trains on Gamle Vossebanen.

All passenger trains on the Bergen Line stop at Arna. The most frequent trains are shuttle trains which run between the Bergen Railway Station and Arna, providing the fastest connection between downtown Bergen and Arna. These normally operate each half-hour, or hourly in weekends and evenings.

References
Entry at Jernbaneverket
Entry at NSB
Entry at Norsk Jernbaneklubb

Railway stations in Bergen
Railway stations on Bergensbanen
Railway stations opened in 1964